Afro-Peruvian music,  or Música negra, is a type of Latin American music first developed in Peru by enslaved black people from West Africa, where it is known as Festejo. The genre is a mix of West African and Spanish music.

About
Música Criolla includes flamenco-influenced guitar sounds, as well as percussion instruments, including cajon, cajita, cowbell and quijada.

History
Much of the original music has been lost, but in the 1950s a revival was staged by José Durand, a white Peruvian criollo who was a folklore professor, and Porfirio Vásquez.  Durand founded the Pancho Fierro Dance Company.  Drawing upon elderly members of the community for memories of musical traditions, Durand collaborated with Vásquez to revive various songs and dances to create the repertoire for the group.  One of the best known is his revival of the carnival dance “El Son de los Diablos.”  In colonial times, this dance was featured in parades with a fleet of austere, pure angels leading the way, followed by the mischievous devils.  In the revival of the dance, the angels were eliminated, and the crowds were entertained by rambunctious devils and their leader “el diablo mayor.”  The dance featured energetic zapateo tap-dancing. The group performed for about two years, including a concert for Peruvian composer Chabuca Granda and a tour through Chile.

Actually, poet Nicomendes Santa Cruz and Victoria Santa Cruz (siblings) both created Cumanana (1957) an Afroperuvian ensemble that highlighted the rich West and Central African call and response poetry, music / dance traditions that were a staple of Peruvian culture and are essentially valued to this day.

One long lasting Afro-Peruvian dance company was Perú Negro, which, incorporated more modern use of percussion combined with criollo music.  Perú Negro is also known for their use of blackface, celebrating the mixture of African and Spanish heritage.  Two of their best known pieces are “Dance of the Laundresses,” which depicts historical hard working yet beautiful black women in Peru, and the “Canto a Elegua,” which shows tribal religion before the Spanish influence.

Lima, Cañete and Chincha are areas where there are many performers of this music, which is played in night clubs, dinner dances and festivals.  Notable artists and groups through the years have included Victoria and Nicomedes Santa Cruz,  Ronaldo Campos, Caitro Soto, Lucila Campos, Pepe Vásquez, and Susana Baca. One of the best known songs in the genre is Peru's "Toro Mata".

However, regardless of the reconstructed dances, there are manifestations that did last in time, such as the "Dance of Negritos and Pallitas" practiced at Christmas parties in the towns of the central-south coast of Peru.

See also
 Afro-Peruvian
 Cañete
Music of Peru
Música criolla

References

External links
 María Lamento, Peruvian Music
 Peru Profundo Dance Company - folkloric dance company in Chicago that performs Afro-Peruvian and Andean dances.
 Peruvian Dance Company - San Francisco Bay Area's most prominent Peruvian dance troupe (Dancers Group).
 DE CAJóN Project - Seattle-based community arts organization dedicated to educating populations about the cultural contributions of Peruvians of African descent.

Afro-Peruvian
Afro–Latin American culture
Peruvian music